BJY may refer to:

 BJY, the IATA code for Batajnica Air Base, Belgrade, Serbia
 BJY, the Pinyin code for Beijing Chaoyang railway station, Beijing, China
 BJY, the Telegraph code for Baoji railway station, Shaanxi, China